Exposed is a 1983 American drama film written, produced and directed by James Toback. It stars Nastassja Kinski, Rudolf Nureyev, Harvey Keitel, Ian McShane and Bibi Andersson.

Plot

The subject of her professor's romantic designs, Elizabeth Carlson a college girl from Wisconsin, packs up and moves to New York City, finding a job as a waitress while she attempts to launch a career as a fashion model.

As her career takes off, she meets Daniel Jelline, a violinist, who aggressively stalks Elizabeth until they begin an affair. When work takes her to Paris, however, Elizabeth encounters a terrorist named Rivas and her life is placed in considerable danger.

Cast

 Nastassja Kinski as Elizabeth Carlson
 Rudolf Nureyev as Daniel Jelline
 Harvey Keitel as Rivas
 Ian McShane as Greg Miller
 Bibi Andersson as Margaret
 Ron Randell as Curt
 Pierre Clémenti as Vic
 James Russo as Nick
 Tony Sirico as Record Store Thief
 James Toback as Leo Boscovitch
 Amy Steel as Party Guest
 Janice Dickinson and Iman appear as Models

Production
James Toback claims he tried for a number of years to get the film financed but was unsuccessful. He says he won $2 million gambling in Las Vegas and spent a portion of this to bribe David Begelman, then head of MGM, to get him to authorise MGM to finance the film. MGM provided a budget of $18 million of which Toback's fee was $500,000. Filming took 80 days. Serge Silberman was executive producer.

Toback says he based the script on a romance he had with an airline stewardess.

"I've changed roughly 80% of the script I showed MGM," he said later, "and I write and rewrite every night."

This movie was filmed on UVM campus in Burlington, VT.

It was the last film role for Ron Randell.

Reception
"The movie is unlike anything being released by major studios today," said Toback at the time of the film's release, "and so its confusing to people who market movies". Toback was allowed to be involved in the promotion of the film. "I'm being treated a lot better than most studios would treat me," he said. "I'm not getting much money but I'm being treated a lot better than most studios treat me... I figure now I have a remote chance of putting across a movie that only got made by a miracle anyway."

Toback says the film had a "mixed" reception.

References

External links
 

Review of film at The New York Times

1983 films
1983 drama films
American drama films
Films scored by Georges Delerue
Films about terrorism
Films set in New York City
Films set in Paris
Films shot in New York City
Metro-Goldwyn-Mayer films
United Artists films
1980s English-language films
Films directed by James Toback
1980s American films
English-language drama films